Qatil (translation: Killer) is a 1988 Indian Hindi-language thriller film directed by Ashok Gaikwad and produced by Shama Akhtar and Nasim Hijazi. The film stars Aditya Pancholi and Sangeeta Bijlani in the lead roles. Shakti Kapoor plays the antagonist. Kiran Kumar, Amjad Khan, Raza Murad, Vikram Gokhale and Anjana Mumtaz play supporting roles. The soundtrack is composed by Laxmikant–Pyarelal with lyrics by Sameer.

The film follows the story of a young law student who challenges the law of death penalty and implicates himself in a murder case of a prostitute to prove that innocent people are given the punishment of death penalty.

Cast
Aditya Pancholi as Kumar S. Sinha
Sangeeta Bijlani as Kiran Mathur
Shakti Kapoor as Anand Varma
Kiran Kumar as Inspector Shyam Verma
Swapna as Kamla (special guest appearance)
Amjad Khan as Badshah Akram Khan
Raza Murad as Public Prosecutor Sharad Sinha
Vikram Gokhale as J.B. Mathur
Anjana Mumtaz as Advocate Savitri S. Sinha
Satyen Kappu as Police Commissioner
Jamuna	as Champa
Pinchoo Kapoor as Judge
Mac Mohan as Police Officer
Mohan Choti as Prison Inmate
Jaya Mathur as Kumar's sister
Harish Patel as Havaldar Hamid Rashid Khan
Viju Khote as Red Rose Club Announcer

Soundtrack

The soundtrack of the film was composed by Laxmikant–Pyarelal. Playback singers on the album include Mohammad Aziz, Shabbir Kumar, Amit Kumar, Alka Yagnik, Kavita Krishnamurthy and Johnny Whisky.

External links

1988 films
1980s Hindi-language films
Indian thriller films
Films scored by Laxmikant–Pyarelal
Films directed by Ashok Gaikwad